The Rumpler B.I (factory designation 4A) was a military reconnaissance aircraft produced in Germany during World War I.

Design and development
The B.I was a conventional two-bay biplane with unstaggered wings of unequal span. It featured two open cockpits in tandem and fixed, tailskid undercarriage. Its upper wing reflected the wing design of the Etrich Taube that Rumpler was building at the time.

Rumpler built 198 of these aircraft for the Luftstreitkräfte, plus 26 seaplane versions for the Imperial German Navy.

Variants
 4A - landplane with Mercedes D.I engine, military designation B.I
 4A13 - B.I with balanced, comma-style rudder
 4A14 - version with Benz Bz.III engine
 4B - seaplane
 4B1 - version with Mercedes D.I engine
 4B2 - version with Benz Bz.III engine
 4B11 - version with Benz Bz.I engine
 4B12 - version with Benz Bz.III engine

Operators

Royal Danish Air Force - Postwar.

Luftstreitkrafte
Kaiserliche Marine

Ottoman Air Force

Specifications

Notes

References

Further reading

B.I
1910s German military reconnaissance aircraft
Single-engined tractor aircraft
Biplanes
Aircraft first flown in 1914